Fucking Consumer is an album by electronic music artist I-F. It was released in 1998 by Disko B records, and re-released in 2004 by EFA records. The song End Theme features a cameo by vocalist Gitane Demone of the gothic rock band Christian Death.

Track listing
 "Space Invaders Are Smoking Grass" (Ferenc Van Der Sluijs) – 6:08 
 "Theme from Sunwheel Beachbar" (Lonny "Lookout" Eyes) – 6:21 
 "I Do Because I Couldn't Care Less" (Eyes) – 5:08 
 "Spiegelbeeld" (Eyes) – 6:56 
 "Playstation No. 1 (instrumental)" (Eyes) – 5:01 
 "Daddy Says" (Eyes) – 0:30 
 "Torment" (Eyes) – 6:38 
 "Energy Vampire" (Eyes) – 6:58 
 "Disko Slique (instrumental)" (Eyes) – 5:36 
 "Cry" (I-F, Nimoy) – 6:28 
 "Assault on Radical Radio" (Eyes) –   4:51 
 "The Man With the Stick" (Eyes) – 7:30 
 "Endtheme" (Gitane Demone, Eyes) – 5:14

References

External links
 Fucking Consumer at the Disko B site

1998 albums
I-F albums